Hotel Bristol is a hotel in Oslo, Norway. Opened in 1920, it is owned today by Olav Thon. The hotel has 251 rooms, 10 suites and three restaurants.

On the evening of July 15, 1936, the city of Oslo offered at the hotel a dinner for participants in the 1936 International Congress of Mathematicians.

In 1939,  the Oslo Report was written by Hans Ferdinand Mayer during his stay at the hotel. During World War II, the hotel was requisitioned as a hospital to treat casualties from the December 1943 explosion of a German munitions ship in Oslo's harbor.

See also
Hotel Bristol

References

External links

Official site

Hotels in Oslo
Hotels established in 1920
Hotel buildings completed in 1920
Hotel Bristol